is a lake located in Yama District, Fukushima, Japan. It is a part of the Bandai-Asahi National Park and is the largest of the lakes in the Bandai-kōgen highlands.

Formation
A mesotrophic lake, Lake Hibara was formed as a result of the July 15, 1888 eruption of Mount Bandai. The resulting debris avalanche created a natural dam that then filled with water, submerging . The remains of Hibara Village still lie at the bottom of the lake.

Recreation
A tourist industry has built up around Lake Hibara, offering hiking trails, pleasure cruises, and campgrounds and other lodging. In the winter, ice fishing is popular.

Climate

Gallery

Notes

References

Hibara
Tourist attractions in Fukushima Prefecture
Landforms of Fukushima Prefecture
Kitashiobara, Fukushima